The St Osyth Witches is a common reference to the convictions for witchcraft near Essex in 1582. A village near Brightlingsea in Essex, St Osyth was home to fourteen women who were put on trial for witchcraft, some of whom were duly convicted according to law.

Ursula Kemp 
The first to be accused was a woman called Ursula Kemp. It was through her reputation of being able to undo curses that had been placed upon people by the means of witchcraft that led to her own accusation of witchcraft by Grace Thurlowe.

Trial 
The testimony of Ursula Kemp's eight-year-old son helped to secure a conviction: partly because of her son's evidence and partly because of the court's promise to treat her with clemency, she confessed to the art of witchcraft, and in this confession (as was often the case) she implicated others that she knew.

The charges brought against Kemp ranged from preventing beer from brewing to causing a death through the means of sorcery, the punishment for which was execution.

When the trial ended Kemp was executed by hanging along with Elizabeth Bennet, who was found guilty of murdering four people through witchcraft and confessed to having two familiars.

See also 
 Witch-hunt

Further reading 
Geddes and Grosset, Witchcraft

References

External links 
http://www.witchtrials.co.uk/1582.html
http://www.bloodylexicon.com/monsters/ursula-kemp-and-the-st-osyth-witches/
http://uk.prweb.com/releases/2011/11/prweb8974277.htm

1582 in law
1582 in England
16th-century trials
Witch trials in England
St Osyth